Sprigg may refer to:

People
James Cresap Sprigg (1802-1852), American politician who represented Kentucky as a United States Representative
John Gordon Sprigg (1830–1913), Prime Minister of the Cape Colony
Joshua Sprigg (1618-1684), English Independent theologian and preacher
Michael Sprigg (1791-1845), American politician who represented Maryland as a U.S. Representative; brother of James Cresap Sprigg
Reg Sprigg (1919-1994), Australian geologist
Richard Sprigg, Jr. (c. 1769–1806), American politician who represented Maryland in the U.S. House of Representatives and later served as a state court justice
Richard Keith Sprigg (1922-2011), British linguist
Samuel Sprigg (1783-1855), American politician who served as Governor of Maryland from 1819 to 1822
Thomas Sprigg (1747–1809), American politician who represented the fourth district of Maryland in the United States House of Representatives from 1793 to 1797
William Sprigg Hall (1832-1875), American lawyer and politician from Minnesota

Other uses
Sprigg Township, Adams County, Ohio, United States
Sprigg, a fictional character in the PlayStation game Chrono Cross

See also
Sprick
Sprigge
Spriggs